Holly Fulger is an American actress. She is best known for her roles as Robin Dulitski in Anything but Love and as Holly Jamison on Ellen. 

In 2018, she started a non-profit True Beauty Discovery.

Early life
Holy Fulger was born in Lakewood, Ohio, Holly studied stage acting in Chicago with the acclaimed Remains Theatre Co.

Career
She starred in the American premiere of Road, Our Country's Good and Lloyd's Prayer, and plays at the Goodman Theatre with Tony award-winning director Robert Falls. She has guest-starred on many notable TV series such as Without a Trace in 2006. She also had notable recurring roles on thirtysomething and 7th Heaven.

Her most notable roles to date may be her regular roles on the television series Anything But Love and These Friends of Mine, which was renamed Ellen after the first year. She also had a notable role in the Zenon TV movie trilogy on Disney Channel as the protagonist's Aunt Judy.

Since 2014, she has hosted The Hollywood Beauty Detective as a creator.

Filmography

Film

Television

Producer

Director

Writer

References

External links 

LinkedIn Page
True Beauty Discovery Website

American television actresses
Living people
People from Lakewood, Ohio
Year of birth missing (living people)
American film actresses
American stage actresses
Actresses from Ohio
20th-century American actresses
21st-century American actresses